Mikael Torfason (born 8 August 1974) is an Icelandic novelist, playwright, screenwriter, journalist, and director. He has written seven novels, published in Iceland, Denmark, Finland, Germany and Lithuania. He has also written for film and theatre. In 2002 he directed his first feature film and he has also been editor-in-chief of Iceland's biggest newspapers.

About 
Mikael was born in Reykjavik in 1974. He started is journalist career in 1996 as a columnist at Helgarpósturinn. He was as a journalist at Dagblaðið Vísir (DV) and later its editor. Following his stay at DV, he was  editor-in-chief at Birtingur and Fréttablaðið. He has written several novels, all published in Iceland and some have traveled in Europe; translated into Germany, Danish, Finnish, Swedish, Lithuanian. Mikael also wrote and directed the feature film Made in Iceland (Gemsar). The film was very well received in Iceland, and traveled the film festival, and got nominated as Best Picture in Scandinavia in 2002.

Lost in Paradise (Týnd í Paradís) is Mikael's latest book. His fourth novel, Samuel, was nominated for The Icelandic Literature Prize and his third novel, The Worlds Stupidest Dad, was nominated for The Nordic Literature Prize in Scandinavia as well as the DV Literature Prize.

Mikael has also written for theatre, and his plays have had great success in Iceland, Norway, Germany and the US. As a journalist he has worked in radio, TV, and been editor-in-chief for two of the three big newspapers in Iceland, as well as being executive director for the largest magazine media company in Iceland.

In 2013, the film Falskur fugl, based on Mikael's first book, premiered in Iceland. He was one of the writers of the drama miniseries Blackport, along with Gísli Örn Garðarsson and Björn Hlynur Haraldsson.

Bibliography 
BRÉF TIL MÖMMU (A LETTER TO MY MOTHER) Memoir – 2019
SYNDAFALLIÐ (FALL OF MANKIND) Memoir – 2017
TÝND Í PARADÍS (LOST IN PARADISE) Memoir – 2015
VORMENN ÍSLANDS (MADE IN ICELAND) Novel – 2009
SAMÚEL (SAMUEL) Novel – 2002
HEIMSINS HEIMSKASTI PABBI (WORLD'S DUMBEST DAD) Novel – 2000
SAGA AF STÚLKU (STORY OF A GIRL) Novel – 1998
FALSKUR FUGL (BLACK BIRD) Novel – 1997

Plays 
DIE EDDA* (THE EDDA) - City Theater in Hannover 2018
GUÐ BLESSI ÍSLAND* (GOD BLESS ICELAND) - City Theater 2017
ENEMY OF THE DUCK* National Theatre in Oslo 2016
NJÁLA* (THE STORY OF BURNT NJAL) - City Theater 2015
SÍÐUSTU DAGAR KJARVALS (KJARVAL’S LAST DAYS) – Radio Theater 2015
HARMSAGA (TRAGEDY) – Icelandic National Theater 2013
HINN FULLKOMNI MAÐUR (THE PERFECT MAN) – City Theater 2002
(written in collaboration with director Thorleifur Orn Arnarsson)

Films 
Falskur fugl – 2013
Gemsar  – 2002

Series
Blackport - 2021-2022 (script)

Journalism 
Editor-in-chief (director of 365 News) – 2013–2014
Editor-in-chief at Fréttatíminn. A national newspaper in Iceland – 2012
Editor-in-chief at Birtingur publishing house – 2006–2007
Project manager at 365 Media Denmark. Starting a new newspaper (Nyhedsavisen) – 2006
Editor-in-chief at Dagbladid, a national newspaper in Iceland – 2003–2006
Editor-in-chief of Focus, a cultural weekly in Iceland – 1998–2000

References

External links
 

1974 births
Living people
Mikael Torfason
Mikael Torfason